Shlomo Yitzchaki (22 February 1040 – 13 July 1105), today generally known by the acronym Rashi, was a medieval French rabbi, the author of comprehensive commentaries on the Talmud and Hebrew Bible.

Acclaimed for his ability to present the basic meaning of the text in a concise and lucid fashion, Rashi's commentaries appeal to both learned scholars and beginning students, and his works remain a centerpiece of contemporary Torah study. A large fraction of rabbinic literature published since the Middle Ages discusses Rashi, either using his view as supporting evidence or debating against it. His commentary on the Talmud, which covers nearly all of the Babylonian Talmud, has been included in every edition of the Talmud since its first printing by Daniel Bomberg in the 1520s. His commentaries on the Tanakh—especially his commentary on the Chumash (the "Five Books of Moses")—serves as the basis of more than 300 "supercommentaries" which analyze Rashi's choice of language and citations, penned by some of the greatest names in rabbinic literature.

Name
Rashi's surname, Yitzhaki, derives from his father's name, Yitzhak. The acronym "Rashi" stands for Rabbi Shlomo Yitzhaki, but is sometimes fancifully expanded as Rabban Shel YIsrael which means the "Rabbi of Israel", or as Rabbenu SheYichyeh (Our Rabbi, may he live). He may be cited in Hebrew and Aramaic texts as (1) "Shlomo son of Rabbi Yitzhak", (2) "Shlomo son of Yitzhak", (3) "Shlomo Yitzhaki", and myriad similar highly respectful derivatives.

In older literature, Rashi is sometimes referred to as Jarchi or Yarhi, his abbreviated name being interpreted as Rabbi Shlomo Yarhi. This was understood to refer to the Hebrew name of Lunel in Provence, popularly derived from the occitan luna "moon", in Hebrew , in which Rashi was assumed to have lived at some time or to have been born, or where his ancestors were supposed to have originated. Later Christian writers Richard Simon and Johann Christoph Wolf claimed that only Christian scholars referred to Rashi as Jarchi, and that this epithet was unknown to the Jews. Bernardo de Rossi, however, demonstrated that Hebrew scholars also referred to Rashi as Yarhi. In 1839, Leopold Zunz showed that the Hebrew usage of Jarchi was an erroneous propagation of the error by Christian writers, instead interpreting the abbreviation as it is understood today: Rabbi Shlomo Yitzhaki. The evolution of this term has been thoroughly traced.

Biography

Birth and early life
Rashi was an only child born at Troyes, Champagne, in northern France. His mother's brother was Simeon bar Isaac, rabbi of Mainz. Simon was a disciple of Gershom ben Judah, who died that same year. On his father's side, Rashi has been claimed to be a 33rd-generation descendant of Johanan HaSandlar, who was a fourth-generation descendant of Gamaliel,  who was reputedly descended from the Davidic line. In his voluminous writings, Rashi himself made no such claim at all. The main early rabbinical source about his ancestry, Responsum No. 29 by Solomon Luria, makes no such claim either.

Legends
His fame later made him the subject of many legends. One tradition contends that his parents were childless for many years. Rashi's father, Yitzhak, a poor winemaker, once found a precious jewel and was approached by non-Jews who wished to buy it to adorn their idol. Yitzhak agreed to travel with them to their land, but en route, he cast the gem into the sea. Afterwards he was visited by either the Voice of God or the prophet Elijah, who told him that he would be rewarded with the birth of a noble son "who would illuminate the world with his Torah knowledge."

Another legend also states that Rashi's parents moved to Worms, Germany while Rashi's mother was pregnant. As she walked down one of the narrow streets in the Jewish quarter, she was imperiled by two oncoming carriages. She turned and pressed herself against a wall, which opened to receive her. This miraculous niche is still visible in the wall of the Worms Synagogue.

Yeshiva studies

According to tradition, Rashi was first brought to learn Torah by his father on Shavuot day at the age of five. His father was his main Torah teacher until his death when Rashi was still a youth. At the age of 17 he married and soon after went to learn in the yeshiva of Yaakov ben Yakar in Worms, returning to his wife three times yearly, for the Days of Awe, Passover and Shavuot. When Yaakov died in 1064, Rashi continued learning in Worms for another year in the yeshiva of his relative, Isaac ben Eliezer Halevi, who was also chief rabbi of Worms. Then he moved to Mainz, where he studied under another of his relatives, Isaac ben Judah, the rabbinic head of Mainz and one of the leading sages of the Lorraine region straddling France and Germany.

Rashi's teachers were students of Rabbeinu Gershom and Eliezer Hagadol, leading Talmudists of the previous generation. From his teachers, Rashi imbibed the oral traditions pertaining to the Talmud as they had been passed down for centuries, as well as an understanding of the Talmud's  logic and forms of argument. Rashi took concise, copious notes from what he learned in yeshiva, incorporating this material in his commentaries. He was also greatly influenced by the exegetical principles of Menahem Kara.

Rosh yeshiva
He returned to Troyes at the age of 25, after which time his mother died, and he was asked to join the Troyes Beth din (rabbinical court). He also began answering halakhic questions. Upon the death of the head of the Bet din, Zerach ben Abraham, Rashi assumed the court's leadership and answered hundreds of halakhic queries.

At some time around 1070 he founded a yeshiva which attracted many disciples. It is thought by some that Rashi earned his living as a vintner since Rashi shows an extensive knowledge of its utensils and process, but there is no evidence for this. Most scholars and a Jewish oral tradition contend that he was a vintner. The only reason given for the centuries-old tradition that he was a vintner being not true is that the soil in all of Troyes is not optimal for  growing wine grapes, claimed by the research of Haym Soloveitchik. There exists a reference to a seal said to be from his vineyard. 

Although there are many legends about his travels, Rashi likely never went further than from the Seine to the Rhine; his furthest destinations were the yeshivas of Lorraine.

In 1096, the People's Crusade swept through the Lorraine, murdering 12,000 Jews and uprooting whole communities. Among those murdered in Worms were the three sons of Isaac ben Eliezer Halevi, Rashi's teacher. Rashi wrote several Selichot (penitential poems) mourning the slaughter and the destruction of the region's great yeshivot. Seven of Rashi's Selichot still exist, including Adonai Elohei Hatz'vaot, which is recited on the eve of Rosh Hashanah, and Az Terem Nimtehu, which is recited on the Fast of Gedalia.

Death and burial site

Rashi died on July 13, 1105 (Tammuz 29, 4865) at the age of 65. He was buried in Troyes. The approximate location of the cemetery in which he was buried was recorded in Seder ha-Dorot, but over time the location of the cemetery was forgotten. A number of years ago, a Sorbonne professor discovered an ancient map depicting the site of the cemetery, which lay under an open square in the city of Troyes. After this discovery, French Jews erected a large monument in the center of the square—a large, black and white globe featuring the three Hebrew letters of רשי artfully arranged counterclockwise in negative space, evoking the style of Hebrew microcalligraphy. The granite base of the monument is engraved: Rabbi Shlomo Yitzchaki — Commentator and Guide.

In 2005, Yisroel Meir Gabbai erected an additional plaque at this site marking the square as a burial ground. The plaque reads: "The place you are standing on is the cemetery of the town of Troyes. Many Rishonim are buried here, among them Rabbi Shlomo, known as Rashi the holy, may his merit protect us".

Descendants

Rashi had no male descendants. All of his three children were girls, named Yocheved, Miriam and Rachel. He invested himself in their education; his writings and the legends which surround him suggest that his daughters were well-versed in the Torah and the Talmud (at a time when women were not expected to study them) and would for instance help him when he was too weak to write. His daughters would marry his disciples; most present-day Ashkenazi rabbinical dynasties can trace their lineage back to his daughters Miriam or Yocheved.

A late-20th century legend claims that Rashi's daughters wore tefillin. While a few women in medieval Ashkenaz did wear tefillin, there is no evidence that Rashi's daughters did.

 Rashi's oldest daughter, Yocheved, married Meir ben Samuel; their four sons were Shmuel (Rashbam; born 1080), Yitzchak (Rivam; born 1090), Jacob (Rabbeinu Tam; born 1100), and Shlomo the Grammarian, all of whom were among the most prolific Tosafists. Yocheved's daughter, Channah, is reputed to have instructed the local women to recite the blessing after candle lighting (instead of before).
 Rashi's middle daughter, Miriam, married Judah ben Nathan, who completed the commentary on the Talmud Makkot. Their daughter Alvina was a learned woman whose customs served as the basis for later halakhic decisions. Their son Yom Tov later moved to Paris and headed a yeshiva there, together with his brothers Shimshon and Eliezer.
 Rashi's youngest daughter, Rachel, married (and divorced) Eliezer ben Shemiah.

Works

Commentary on the Tanakh

Rashi's commentary on the Tanakh—and especially his commentary on the Chumash—is the essential companion for any study of the Bible among Orthodox Jews. Drawing on the breadth of Midrashic, Talmudic and Aggadic literature (including literature that is no longer extant), as well as his knowledge of Hebrew grammar and halakhah, Rashi clarifies the "simple" meaning of the text so that a bright child of five could understand it. At the same time, his commentary forms the foundation for some of the most profound legal analysis and mystical discourses that came after it. Scholars debate why Rashi chose a particular Midrash to illustrate a point, or why he used certain words and phrases and not others. Shneur Zalman of Liadi wrote that "Rashi's commentary on Torah is the 'wine of Torah'. It opens the heart and uncovers one's essential love and fear of G-d."

Scholars believe that Rashi's commentary on the Torah grew out of the lectures he gave to his students in his yeshiva, and evolved with the questions and answers they raised on it. Rashi completed this commentary only in the last years of his life. It was immediately accepted as authoritative by all Jewish communities, Ashkenazi and Sephardi alike.

The first dated Hebrew printed book was Rashi's commentary on the Chumash, printed by Abraham ben Garton in Reggio di Calabria, Italy, 18 February 1475. (This version did not include the text of the Chumash itself.)

Rashi wrote commentaries on all the books of Tanakh except Chronicles I & II, and Ezra–Nehemiah. His commentary to Job is incomplete, ending at 40:25.

A main characteristic of Rashi's writing was his focus on grammar and syntax. His primary focus was on word choice, and "essentially [he acts] as a dictionary where he defines unusual Hebrew words." He searches for things that may not be clear to the reader and offers clarification on the inconsistency that may be present. Rashi does so by "filling in missing information that [helps] lead to a more complete understanding" of the Torah. A portion of his writing is dedicated to making distinctions between the peshat, or plain and literal meaning of the text, and the aggadah or rabbinic interpretation. One of Rashi's grandchildren, Samuel B. Meir or Rashbam, heavily critiqued his response on his "commentary on the Torah [being] based primarily on the classic midrashim (rabbinic homilies)."

Commentary on the Talmud

Rashi wrote the first comprehensive commentary on the Talmud, covering nearly all of the Babylonian Talmud (a total of 30 out of 39 tractates, due to his death). The commentary, drawing on his knowledge of the entire contents of the Talmud, attempts to provide a full explanation of the words and of the logical structure of each Talmudic passage. Unlike other commentators, Rashi does not paraphrase or exclude any part of the text, but elucidates phrase by phrase. Often he provides punctuation in the unpunctuated text, explaining, for example, "This is a question"; "He says this in surprise", "He repeats this in agreement", etc.

As in his commentary on the Tanakh, Rashi frequently illustrates the meaning of the text using analogies to the professions, crafts, and sports of his day. He also translates difficult Hebrew or Aramaic words into the spoken French language of his day, giving latter-day scholars a window into the vocabulary and pronunciation of Old French.

Rashi's Talmud commentary spread quickly, reaching Jews as far as Yemen by mid-12th century. It has been included in every version of the Talmud since its first printing in the fifteenth century. It is always situated towards the middle of the opened book display; i.e., on the side of the page closest to the binding.

Some of the other printed commentaries which are attributed to Rashi were composed by others, primarily his students. Akiva Eger stated that the commentary on Nazir was not in fact by Rashi, while Zvi Hirsch Chajes stated that the commentary on Taanit was not by Rashi. In some editions of the Talmud, the text indicates that Rashi died before completing the tractate, and that it was completed by a student. This is true of Makkot (the end of which was composed by his son-in-law, Judah ben Nathan), and of Bava Batra (finished, in a more detailed style, by his grandson the Rashbam). The commentary attributed to Rashi on Horayot was thought by some to have been written by Judah ben Nathan, but evidence was uncovered indicating that the commentary on Horayot was from the school of Gershom ben Judah. There is a legend that the commentary on Nedarim, which is clearly not his, was actually composed by his daughters. Another legend states that Rashi died while writing a commentary on Talmud, and that the very last word he wrote was 'tahor,' which means pure in Hebrew - indicating that his soul was pure as it left his body.

Responsa
About 300 of Rashi's responsa and halakhic decisions are extant. Although some may find contradictory to Rashi's intended purpose for his writings, these responsa were copied, preserved, and published by his students, grandchildren, and other future scholars. Siddur Rashi, compiled by an unknown student, also contains Rashi's responsa on prayer. Many other rulings and responsa are recorded in Mahzor Vitry. Other compilations include Sefer Hapardes, probably edited by Shemaiah of Troyes, Rashi's student, and Sefer Haorah, prepared by Nathan Hamachiri.

Rashi's writing is placed under the category of post-Talmudic, for its explanation and elaboration on the Talmud; however, he not only wrote about the meaning of Biblical and Talmudic passages, but also on liturgical texts, syntax rules, and cases regarding new religions emerging. Some say that his responsa allows people to obtain "clear pictures of his personality," and shows Rashi as a kind, gentle, humble, and liberal man. They also illustrate his intelligence and common sense.

Rashi's responsa not only addressed some of the different cases and questions regarding Jewish life and law, but it shed light into the historical and social conditions which the Jews were under during the First Crusade. He covered the following topics and themes in his responsa: linguistic focus on texts, law related to prayer, food, and the Sabbath, wine produced by non-Jews, oaths and excommunications, sales, partnerships, loans and interest, bails, communal affairs, and civil law. Rashi's responsa can be broken down into three genres: questions by contemporary sages and students regarding the Torah, the law, and other compilations.

For example, in his writing regarding relations with the Christians, he provides a guide for how one should behave when dealing with martyrs and converts, as well as the "insults and terms of [disgrace] aimed at the Jews." Stemming from the aftermath of the Crusades, Rashi wrote concerning those who were forced to convert, and the rights women had when their husbands were killed.

Rashi focused the majority of his responsa, if not all, on a "meticulous analysis of the language of the text".

Legacy
Rashi was one of the first authors to write in Old French (the language he spoke in everyday life, which he used alongside Hebrew), as most contemporary French authors instead wrote in Latin. As a consequence, besides its religious value, his work is currently valued for the insight it gives into the language and culture of Northern France in the 11th century.

Commentary on the Tanakh

Today, tens of thousands of men, women and children study "Chumash with Rashi" as they review the Torah portion to be read in synagogue on the upcoming Shabbat. According to halakha, a man may even fulfill of the requirement of Shnayim mikra ve-echad targum by reading Rashi's commentary rather than the standard Targum Onkelos. Since its publication, Rashi's commentary on the Torah is standard in almost all Chumashim produced within the Orthodox Jewish community. Mordechai Leifer of Nadvorna said that anyone who learns the weekly Parsha together with the commentary by Rashi every week is guaranteed to sit in the Yeshiva (school) of Rashi in the Afterlife.

Voluminous supercommentaries have been published on Rashi's Bible commentaries, including Gur Aryeh by Judah Loew (the Maharal), Sefer ha-Mizrachi by Elijah Mizrachi (the Re'em), and Yeri'ot Shlomo by Solomon Luria (the Maharshal). Menachem Mendel Schneerson, in his Rashi Sichos, often addresses several of these commentaries at once.

Rashi's influence grew the most in the 15th century; from the 17th century onwards, his commentaries were translated into many other languages. Rashi's commentary on the Pentateuch was known as the first printed Hebrew work. Notable English translations include those of Rosenbaum and Silbermann and ArtScroll.

Commentary on the Talmud

Rashi's commentary on the Talmud continues to be a key basis for contemporary rabbinic scholarship and interpretation. Without Rashi's commentary, the Talmud would have remained a closed book.

Rashi's commentary had a profound influence on subsequent Talmud study and scholarship:

The presence of Rashi's commentary also changed the nature of subsequent Talmud commentaries:

In general, Rashi's commentary provides the peshat or literal meaning of the Talmud, while subsequent commentaries such as the Tosafot often go beyond the passage itself in terms of arguments, parallels, and distinctions that could be drawn out. This addition to Jewish texts was seen as causing a "major cultural product" which became an important part of Torah study.
In the standard printed Talmud, the Tosafot's commentaries can be found in the Talmud opposite Rashi's commentary. The Tosafot also added comments and criticism in places where Rashi had not added comments.

Rashi also exerted a decisive influence on establishing the correct text of the Talmud. Up to and including his age, texts of each Talmudic tractate were copied by hand and circulated in yeshivas. Errors often crept in: sometimes a copyist would switch words around, and other times incorporate a student's marginal notes into the main text. Because of the large number of merchant-scholars who came from throughout the Jewish world to attend the great fairs in Troyes, Rashi was able to compare different manuscripts and readings in Tosefta, Jerusalem Talmud, Midrash, Targum, and the writings of the Geonim, and determine which readings should be preferred. However, in his humility, he deferred to scholars who disagreed with him. For example, in Chulin 4a, he comments about a phrase, "We do not read this. But as for those who do, this is the explanation..."

Influence in non-Jewish circles
Rashi's commentaries on the Bible, especially those on the Pentateuch, circulated in many different communities. In the 12th–17th centuries, Rashi's influence spread from French and German provinces to Spain and the east. He had a tremendous influence on Christian scholars. The French monk Nicholas de Lyra of Manjacoria, who was known as the "ape of Rashi", relied on Rashi's commentary when writing his Postillae Perpetuate, one of the primary sources used in Luther's translation of the Bible. He believed that Rashi's commentaries were the "official repository of Rabbinical tradition" and significant to understanding the Bible. Rashi's commentaries became significant to humanists at this time who studied grammar and exegesis. Christian Hebraists studied Rashi's commentaries as important interpretations "authorized by the Synagogue".

Although Rashi had an influence on communities outside of Judaism, his lack of connection to science prevented him from entering the general domain, and he remained more popular among the Jewish community.

"Rashi script"

The semi-cursive typeface in which Rashi's commentaries are printed both in the Talmud and Tanakh is often referred to as "Rashi script." Despite the name, Rashi himself did not use such a script: the typeface is based on a 15th-century Sephardic semi-cursive hand, postdating Rashi's death by several hundred years. Early Hebrew typographers such as the Soncino family and Daniel Bomberg employed in their editions of commented texts (such as the Mikraot Gedolot and the Talmud, in which Rashi's commentaries prominently figure) what would become called "Rashi script" to distinguish the rabbinic commentary from the primary text proper, for which they used a square typeface.

References

Citations

Notes

General sources 
 Abecassis, Deborah Reconstructing Rashi's Commentary on Genesis from Citations in the Torah Commentaries in the Tosafot Dissertation 1999, Department of Jewish Studies, McGill University, Montreal, Quebec.
 Rashi The Jewish History Resource Center – Project of the Dinur Center for Research in Jewish History, The Hebrew University of Jerusalem
 Biography, the Legend, the Commentator and more rashi900.com
 Family Tree
 In honor of the 900th anniversary of his passing
 How Rashi, His Students, and His Descendants Molded Ashkenazi Jewry, Menachem Levine, Thinktorah.org
 Rashi; an exhibition of his works, from the treasures of the Jewish National and University Library
 
 
 
 
 
 Eran Viezel, 'Targum Onkelos in Rashi’s Exegetical Consciousness’, Review of Rabbinic Judaism 15 (2012), pp. 1-19 
 Eran Viezel, ‘The Secret of the Popularity of Rashi’s Commentary on Torah’, Review of Rabbinic Judaism 17 (2014), pp. 207-217

External links
 
 
 
 Technique and methodology
 rashiyomi.com
 Full text resources and translation
 Rashi's commentary to Tanakh with translation and supercommentaries
 Complete Tanach with Rashi
 Chumash with Rashi (Judaica Press translation)
 Chumash with Rashi (Metsudah translation)
 Summarized text resources and translation
 Illustrated Summary and Analysis of the Torah with selected Rashi commentary
 Textual Search
 Lookup Verses, rashiyomi.com
 Early manuscripts or printings of Rashi's Perush `al ha-Torah/Commentary on the Torah (text or images, OCR'd or not):
 The 13th-14th c. Codex Parma 3204, which is the "base version" at mgketer.org. Also lists several later versions, as well as early manuscripts of other commentaries e.g. Rashbam, Ramban etc.
 13th-14th c. Cod. hebr. 12b, Cod. hebr. 220 at Austria National Library, Vienna
 13th c. B. H. fol. 1 at Leipzig. U. Library
 13th c. folio 255 at BNF, Paris. 
 c. 1470 Rome, three links.
 
 Uncategorized links:
 Images of manuscripts of Rashi's writings
 Rashi, Tosfos, and the Development of Ashkenazi Jewry
 Public Domain Hebrew and CC-BY English of Rashi on Torah
 "Rashi: Teacher of All Israel", video lecture by Dr. Henry Abramson of Touro College South
 

1040 births
1105 deaths
11th-century French rabbis
12th-century French rabbis
11th-century French writers
12th-century French writers
Bible commentators
Clergy from Troyes
French male writers
Worms, Germany
Medieval Jewish scholars
11th-century Jewish theologians
12th-century Jewish theologians